The Dying of the Light is a 1993 murder mystery novel by Michael Dibdin set in a nursing home.

References

External links
 http://www.randomhouse.com/book/40367/the-dying-of-the-light-by-michael-dibdin

1993 British novels
British crime novels
Faber and Faber books